Fidelma is an Irish female given name.

People named Fidelma
 Fidelma Healy Eames (born 1962), politician
 Fidelma Macken (born 1942), judge
 Sister Fidelma, main character in the Sister Fidelma mysteries
 Fidelma Rodgers-Jones born 1964
 Fidelma Cox born 1958 joint owner Normandy Kitchen Copper
 St.Fidelma, an Irish princess baptised by St. Patrick.

See also
 Fedelm (Irish name)

References

Irish feminine given names